Family Tree is the sixth studio album by American rock band Black Stone Cherry. It was released on April 20, 2018, through Mascot Records. The first two singles, "Burnin'" and "Bad Habit", were released on February 8, and March 8, 2018 respectively, with the audio for the latter being released on YouTube on March 9 and the music video on April 6.

Track listing

Charts

References

2018 albums
Black Stone Cherry albums